Emmi AG is a Swiss milk processor and dairy products company headquartered in Lucerne. The company employs a total of around 8,900 people in Europe (including Switzerland), North America (USA and Mexico), South America (Brazil and Chile) and North Africa (Tunisia). Emmi AG is listed on the SWX Swiss Exchange.

In March 2022, following the Russian invasion of Ukraine, Emmi said it had ceased doing business with Russia. In October 2022, Denner added Emmi's Knospe organic milk to its range. In 2023, Emmi took over the marketing of Sprinz AOP.

References

External links

 

Companies based in Lucerne
Dairy products companies of Switzerland
Yogurt companies
Companies listed on the SIX Swiss Exchange
Swiss brands